Cea Serin is a progressive metal band that was formed in 1997 by bassist/singer/keyboardist J. Lamm.

History
The original line-up of the band was Keith Warman and J. Lamm in 1997.  The band started as a studio project in the down time of Lamm and Warman's progressive metal band, Ashen Dawn.  After the creation of two demo tapes the band was eventually signed to Heavencross Records in Europe.  The band eventually signed to Nightmare Records for the U.S. release of their debut album, "...where memories combine..." in 2004

The band hooked up with Shane Dubose and Darren Davis in Houston to form the first live line-up of Cea Serin.  In mid-2002 Cea Serin played the ProgPower USA music festival.

As of August 2014, the band has signed a deal with Generation Prog Records for the release of their second album, "The Vibrant Sound of Bliss and Decay".

Solo album
In 2008, J. Lamm released a solo, new age album marketed towards Planetariums titled Form & Void: A Digital Universe. The album was conceived as the soundtrack for the Louisiana Art and Science Museum's production of Digital Universe, a show utilizing modern technology and images from the American Museum of Natural History to take patrons through a 3D mapping of the observable universe.

Film work
In 2005, J. Lamm was approached by director, Kevin White, to do the original score for his film, "Broken Promise". The film debuted in 2006 and is currently seeking distribution.

J. Lamm wrote original scores for short films, some of which debuted at the "48 Hour Film Festival", which lead the way to his work in Planetarium music production.

J. Lamm wrote the soundtrack to the Louisiana Art and Science Museum's production of "Digital Universe" in 2008 The soundtrack is also being used in various planetariums around the United States for local planetarium show productions.

In 2014, J. Lamm provided the original score for the Hedges Pictures web-series "Requiems"

Band line-up

Current members
 J. Lamm − lead bass, vocals, keyboards
 Keith Warman − lead guitar and rhythm guitar
 Rory Faciane - Drums

Former members
 Darren Davis − Drums (2002)
 Shane Dubose − Bass (2002)
 Forrest Osterman - Guitar (2002–2011)

Discography
 Demo '97 - demo 1997
 Demo '99 - demo 1999
 Chiaroscuro - 2000 mp3.com only CD
 The Surface of All Things - demo 2001
 "...where memories combine..." (2004)
 The Vibrant Sound of Bliss and Decay (2014)

References

External links
 
 Cea Serin at Nightmare Records
 J. Lamm official site
 Generation Prog Records

Musical groups established in 1997
Heavy metal musical groups from Louisiana
American progressive metal musical groups